Ritu Dhrub (born 16 October 1994 in Sivasagar, Assam) is an Indian cricketer. She plays for the Assam women's cricket team in domestic matches.

References

External links 

 cricketarchive

1994 births
Living people
Indian women cricketers
India women One Day International cricketers
India women Twenty20 International cricketers
Assam women cricketers
East Zone women cricketers
People from Sivasagar
Cricketers from Assam